Hammond is a village in Piatt County, Illinois, United States. The population was 509 at the 2010 census.

History
Hammond was named for Charles Goodrich Hammond, a railroad official.

Geography

Demographics

As of the census of 2000, there were 518 people, 225 households, and 141 families residing in the village. The racial makeup of the village was 98.26% White, 0.58% African American, 0.19% Native American, 0.19% Asian, 0.58% from other races, and 0.19% from two or more races. Hispanic or Latino of any race were 0.19% of the population.

There were 225 households, out of which 24.9% had children under the age of 18 living with them, 55.6% were married couples living together, 5.3% had a female householder with no husband present, and 36.9% were non-families. 32.4% of all households were made up of individuals, and 15.1% had someone living alone who was 65 years of age or older. The average household size was 2.30 and the average family size was 2.95.

In the village, the population was spread out, with 23.6% under the age of 18, 6.9% from 18 to 24, 27.6% from 25 to 44, 24.7% from 45 to 64, and 17.2% who were 65 years of age or older. The median age was 39 years. For every 100 females, there were 111.4 males. For every 100 females age 18 and over, there were 102.0 males.

The median income for a household in the village was $45,833, and the median income for a family was $51,528. Males had a median income of $33,523 versus $21,667 for females. The per capita income for the village was $19,313. About 2.1% of families and 7.1% of the population were below the poverty line, including 11.5% of those under age 18 and 11.1% of those age 65 or over.

References

Villages in Piatt County, Illinois
Villages in Illinois